São Gonçalo is a municipality located in the Brazilian state of Rio de Janeiro. It is on northeastern Guanabara Bay in the Rio de Janeiro Metropolitan Area. It is the 16th most populous city in Brazil.

Geography

Location

It is the second most populous city of the state, after the capital Rio de Janeiro city. Until recently it was the third largest, when Mesquita was split off as its own city from Nova Iguaçu. It is considered an important metropolitan industrial city, being a large part of the local economy and the GDP of the State of Rio de Janeiro.

The municipality contains 4% of the  Guanabara Ecological Station, created in 2006. It contains part of the Central Rio de Janeiro Atlantic Forest Mosaic of conservation units, created in 2006.

Climate
The climate type of São Gonçalo is Atlantic tropical, with rainy summers and relatively dry winters. But for the most part of the year (primarily May to October) the temperature is milder due to the climate being drier and cooler.

Demography

São Gonçalo has a high index of population growth. The city has an estimated population of 1,091,737 (2020 estimate). According to the 2012 Census, the racial makeup of São Gonçalo includes: Whites (22.7%), Brown (54.1%), black or African (20.2%), two or more races (3%) and Asian (0.02%). Non-Brazilian population by any race was 3.5% (Paraguayan 2%, Bolivian 1%, Chinese 0.5%), a high index compared to cities in Brazil.

Territorial organization 

São Gonçalo is administratively divided into 91 bairros (neighborhoods) and 5 distritos (districts).

Education 
The Rio de Janeiro State Teachers Training College (FFP-UERJ) stands out in the city. It is the largest teachers' college in the state of Rio de Janeiro, offering advanced training of senior staff. The campus offers undergraduate courses in Biological Sciences, History, Geography, Letters: Portuguese / Literatures, Letters: Portuguese / English, Mathematics and Pedagogy. More graduates from FFP pass state tests than any other teaching institution in Brazil. Its importance is magnified when one analyzes what an advanced training pole of senior staff from the UERJ is. Its students are mostly residents from São Gonçalo, but many come from Niterói, Rio de Janeiro, Itaboraí, and municipalities of the Baixada Fluminense region, among others. For many years, students of this campus demanding the implementation of a bus intercampi free to link to the Saint Mary UERJ Maracanã.

The Polo Open University of Brazil has courses in the Consortium of Universities CEDERJ UFF (Computer Science), UFRJ (Chemistry) and UFRRJ (Administration and Tourism).

Health 
São Gonçalo has eight major hospitals: Hospital Estadual Alberto Torres; Eye Hospital Niteroi; Hospital Luiz Palmier; Hospital Adam Pereira Nunes; Barone Hospital de Medeiros; Silveira Hospital Infantil Darcy Vargas, Hospital Pads, and Hospital Santa Maria.

Garbage collection crisis 
São Gonçalo suffers constantly from poor garbage collection services, and it is common for litter to accumulate on the streets. In December 2008, workers responsible for cleaning the streets went on strike, severely compromising public sanitation. In January 2011, garbage collection ceased for more than a week in some parts of the city. The garbage collection issue has since been resolved.

Notable people

Helton Arruda, goalkeeper.
Marcelo Freixo, Brazilian politician, broadcaster and professor.
Vinícius Júnior, a professional footballer currently playing for Real Madrid.
Zélio Fernandino de Moraes, founder of the Umbanda Branca religious sect.

See also
Jardim Catarina

References

External links
 

Municipalities in Rio de Janeiro (state)
Guanabara Bay
Populated coastal places in Rio de Janeiro (state)